is a train station in Nichinan, Miyazaki Prefecture, Japan.

Lines

Layout 
The station consists of an island platform serving two tracks at grade with a passing loop running on the west side. The station building is a wooden structure built in western style. It houses a waiting area and a ticket window. The station is not staffed by JR Kyushu but some types of tickets are available from a kan'i itaku agent on site who manages the ticket window.

Adjacent stations

History
The line was then extended northwards in phases, reaching  by 1936. The track was extended further north with Aburatsu opening as the northern terminus on 19 April 1937. The route was designated the Nichinan Line on 8 May 1963. With the privatization of JNR on 1 April 1987, the station came under the control of JR Kyushu.

Passenger statistics
In fiscal 2016, the station was used by an average of 148 passengers (boarding only) per day.

See also
List of railway stations in Japan

References

External links
Aburatsu (JR Kyushu)

Railway stations in Miyazaki Prefecture
Railway stations in Japan opened in 1937